SpareBank 1 Ringerike Hadeland is a Norwegian savings bank, headquartered in Hønefoss, Norway.
The bank's main market is Ringerike in Buskerud and the Hadeland district of Oppland.
The history of the bank goes back to 4 August 1833 with the establishment of Ringerikes Sparebank.

References

Banks of Norway
SpareBank 1
Companies based in Buskerud
Banks established in 2010
Companies listed on the Oslo Stock Exchange
Norwegian companies established in 2010